The 1955 European Shooting Championships was the 1st edition of the global shooting competition, European Shooting Championships, organised by the International Shooting Sport Federation.

Winners
Events was 30, 17 individual and 13 team.

Individual

Team

See also
 European Shooting Confederation
 International Shooting Sport Federation
 List of medalists at the European Shooting Championship

References

External links
 
 European Champion Archive Results at Sport-komplett-de

European Shooting Championships
European Shooting Championships